Dunnideer Castle, now ruined, was a tower house located near Insch, Aberdeenshire, Scotland.  It was built c. 1260 partially from the remains of an existing vitrified hill fort in the same location.  It consisted of a single rectangular tower of 15 m by 12.5 m with walls 1.9 m thick.  Evidence suggests that a first-floor hall existed and that it had several floors.

The tower house is built within an older prehistoric vitrified hillfort dating to c250 BC, excavated by Dr Murray Cook of Rampart Scotland.

The prehistoric fort and tower house is a scheduled monument.

References

External links 
 Take a 360 Virtual Tour of Dunnideer Castle

Castles in Aberdeenshire
Scheduled Ancient Monuments in Aberdeenshire
Hill forts in Scotland